Brevard is the name of some places in the United States of America:

Brevard, North Carolina
Brevard College
Brevard Music Center
Brevard County, Florida